Route 413 is a highway in Missouri running between Route 13 in Springfield and Route 13 in Reeds Spring.  It is an older alignment of Route 13 which was later rerouted.  Except for two sections (in Springfield between Route 13 and US 60 and a 4-mile segment between US 60 and Route 265 southwest of Billings), the road runs concurrent with other designations for its entire length.

Route description 
Route 413 begins at an intersection with Route 13, Route 76 and Route 265 in Branson West. Route 265 joins up with 413 at the southern terminus and the two routes are concurrent. The roads head north and intersect with local roads. Routes 76 and 13 parallel Routes 413 and 265 as the roads continue out of Branson West. The routes proceed through a mountainous region and enter Reeds Spring, where they intersect with a now-separated Route 76. Routes 413 and 265 pass to the west of Emerson Airport and continue northward, still paralleling Route 13. 

Routes 413 and 265 turn sharply to the west and intersect with Route 248. Route 248 joins the concurrency and the three roads make several changes in direction before steadily heading north. Routes 413, 265, and 248 begin to turn in different directions again and cross through more rural territory. The three roads go through a dense forest just south of Galena. At the intersection with Route 176, the three routes turn to the west, where Route 248 turns off. Routes 413 and 265 continue farther west. Northwest of Galena, the roads intersect with their first supplemental route, Route AA. Routes 413 and 265 head through farmlands, where Route 173 terminates.

The roads intersect with another county road in Elsey as they continue northward. Routes 265 and 413 pass a dense forest to the north and heads into Crane. The routes leave Crane after intersecting with a few county and local roads. Near Logan, Route 265 turns off to the east and Route 413 continues northward. Route 413 intersects and becomes concurrent with U.S. Route 60. Routes 413 and 60 then enter the Republic city limits. Route 174 intersects soon afterward. 413 and 60 split and Route 413 heads northeast into Springfield, where Route 413 comes to an end at Route 13.

History 
The highway was originally commissioned in 2000 to replace a section of Route 13 that was rerouted along the James River Freeway and only ran from Kansas Expressway in Springfield to the James River Freeway.

Junction list

References 

413
Transportation in Springfield, Missouri
Transportation in Stone County, Missouri
Transportation in Christian County, Missouri
Transportation in Greene County, Missouri